Santa Cruz de Aragua is a city in the state of Aragua, Venezuela, and part of the metropolitan area of Maracay. It is the shire town of the José Angel Lamas Municipality.

Populated places in Aragua